Surasak Runroengrom (born 13 August 1953) is a former Thai naval officer. He served as commander-in-chief of the Royal Thai Navy from 1 October 2011 to 30 September 2013. Narong Pipathanasai was appointed as his successor.

References 

Living people
1953 births
Place of birth missing (living people)
Surasak Runroengrom
Surasak Runroengrom
Surasak Runroengrom